The Domus Romana (Latin for "Roman House"), stylized as the Domvs Romana (after Latin's lack of distinction between u and v), is a ruined Roman-era house located on the boundary between Mdina and Rabat, Malta. It was built in the 1st century BC as an aristocratic town house (domus) within the Roman city of Melite. In the 11th century, a Muslim cemetery was established on the remains of the domus. 

The site was discovered in 1881, and archaeological excavations revealed several well preserved Roman mosaics, statues and other artifacts, as well as a number of tombstones and other remains from the cemetery. Since 1882, the site has been open to the public as a museum, which is currently run by Heritage Malta. It was erroneously called the Roman Villa when rediscovered as it was thought to be outside the city of Melite but on further examinations it was clarified to be within city limits.

History and description

Roman house

The Domvs Romana is believed to have been built in the beginning of the 1st century BC, and it remained in use until the 2nd century AD. The house had a colonnaded peristyle inspired by ancient Greek architecture, and its best features are the well-made polychrome Hellenistic style mosaics found in the peristyle and the surrounding rooms, which show decorative motifs or mythological scenes. Two types of tesserae were employed: opus vermiculatum, in the centre of the pavement; opus tessellatum, larger tesserae to create three-dimensional designs all around the main image. The picture sought to imitate a highly popular motif which may be first painted by an artist from Sophos. The domus also shows fine painted wall plaster imitating coloured marbles and showing partly stylized architectural elements which would place them somewhere between the 1st and 2nd Pompeian Styles.

Although the house was mostly destroyed over time, its mosaics have survived largely intact, and they are comparable with those found at Pompeii or Sicily. A number of 1st century AD statues of the imperial Roman family, along with coins, glassware, tableware, bath accessories, amphorae and other fine artifacts have also been found in the domus.

Muslim cemetery

In the 11th century, while Malta was part of the Fatimid Caliphate, the site of the domus was converted into a cemetery. At least 245 burials were discovered during the excavations, which also unearthed a number of limestone (and one marble) tombstones with Naskh or Kufic inscriptions. Some ceramics and a silver ring were also found during the excavations.

Discovery and excavations
The Domvs Romana was discovered accidentally in 1881 by workers during a landscaping project. It was subsequently excavated by the leading archaeologists of the time, including Antonio Annetto Caruana, Sir Themistocles Zammit, Robert V. Galea, Harris Dunscombe Colt and Louis Upton Way.

Museum

After the domus was first excavated, a museum was built on the site of the peristyle of the house in order to preserve its mosaics. The museum opened in February 1882, and it was the first building in Malta that was constructed specifically to house a museum of a particular archaeological site. The museum was originally known as the Museum of Roman Antiquities, and apart from the mosaics and other Roman or Muslim artifacts uncovered from the domus, it also exhibited some other Roman marble pieces which were found in the streets of Mdina. Eventually, many Roman artifacts found elsewhere in Malta were transferred to this museum.

In 1922, the museum was enlarged to designs by the architect Galizia, and a neoclassical façade and a large display room were added. The remains of the domus were included on the Antiquities List of 1925. The museum closed during World War II, and it housed a restoration centre before reopening to the public in 1945.

The mosaic of the peristyle was restored in the second half of the 20th century, but was unintentionally damaged in the process. Currently, Heritage Malta is carrying out a report on how to conserve the mosaic and repair it with as little damage as possible. The displays of the museum were renovated between 2002 and 2005, and again in 2011.

Further reading
Ancient mosaic

References

Mdina
Rabat, Malta
Archaeological sites in Malta
Buildings and structures completed in the 1st century BC
Houses in Malta
Ancient Roman buildings and structures in Malta
Cemeteries in Malta
Muslim cemeteries
Former cemeteries
Islam in Malta
1881 archaeological discoveries
Museums established in 1882
Neoclassical architecture in Malta
Museums in Malta
Sites managed by Heritage Malta